The following are the national records in athletics in Mali maintained by its national athletics federation: Fédération Malienne d'Athlétisme (FMA).

Outdoor

Key to tables:

h = hand timing

Men

Women

Indoor

Men

Women

Notes

References

External links

Mali
Records
Athletics